The name grey thrush can refer to several species of bird:

Japanese thrush (Turdus cardis) of eastern Asia
Grey ground-thrush (Zoothera princei) of Africa
Grey shrike-thrush (Colluricincla harmonica) of Australasia

Animal common name disambiguation pages